Khallikote (Sl. No.: 126) is a Vidhan Sabha constituency of Ganjam district, Odisha.

This constituency includes Khallikote, Purusottampur, Khallikote block and  10 Gram panchayats (Achuli, Handighar, K.N Pur, Pratappur, Ranajhali, Raipur, Solaghara, Jagannathpur, Baghala, Bhatakumarada, Sunathara, Badabaragam, Bhimpur, Gangadehuni and Jamuni) of Purusottampur block.

Elected Members

Fifteen elections were held between 1951 and 2014.
Elected members from the Khallikote constituency are:
2019: (126): Suryamani Baidya (BJD)
2014: (126): Purna Chandra Sethy (BJD)
2009: (126): Purna Chandra Sethy (BJD)
2004: (72): V. Sugnan Kumari Deo  (BJD)
2000: (72): V. Sugnan Kumari Deo (BJD)
1995: (72): V. Sugnan Kumari Deo  (Janata Dal)
1990: (72): V. Sugnan Kumari Deo (Janata Dal)
1985: (72): V. Sugnan Kumari Deo  (Janata Party)
1980: (72): Trinath Samantara (Congress)
1977: (72):  V. Sugnan Kumari Deo  (Janata Party)
1974: (72): V. Sugnan Kumari Deo (Utkal Congress)
1971: (68): Trinath Samantara (Utkal Congress)
1967: (68): Narayan Sahu(Samjukta Socialist Party)
1961: (20): Ram Chandra Mardaraj Deo(Congress)
1957: (15): Narayan Sahu  (Independent)
1951: (102): Ram Chandra Mardaraj Deo (Independent)

2019 Election Result

2014 Election Result
In 2014 election, Biju Janata Dal candidate Purna Chandra Sethy defeated  Indian National Congress candidate Pandaba Jalli by a margin of 57.194 votes.

Summary of results of the 2009 Election
In 2009 election, Biju Janata Dal candidate Purna Chandra Sethy defeated Indian National Congress candidate Kasinath Behera by a margin of 44,629 votes.

Notes

References

Assembly constituencies of Odisha
Politics of Ganjam district